Coastal morphodynamics (i.e. the dynamics of beach morphology) refers to the study of the interaction and adjustment of the seafloor topography and fluid hydrodynamic processes, seafloor morphologies and sequences of change dynamics involving the motion of sediment.  Hydrodynamic processes include those of waves, tides and wind-induced currents.

While hydrodynamic processes respond instantaneously to morphological change, morphological change requires the redistribution of sediment.  As sediment takes a finite time to move, there is a lag in the morphological response to hydrodynamic forcing.  Sediment can therefore be considered to be a time-dependent coupling mechanism.  Since the boundary conditions of hydrodynamic forcing change regularly, this may mean that the beach never attains equilibrium. Morphodynamic processes exhibit positive and negative feedbacks (such that beaches can, over different timescales, be considered to be both self-forcing and self-organised systems), nonlinearities and threshold behaviour.

This systems approach to the coast was first developed by Wright and Thom in 1977 and finalized by Wright and Short in 1984. According to their dynamic and morphological characteristics, exposed sandy beaches can be classified into several morphodynamic types (Wright and Short, 1984; Short, 1996). There is a large scale of morphodynamic states, this scale ranges from the "dissipative state" to the "reflective extremes". 

Dissipative beaches are flat, have fine sand, incorporating waves that tend to break far from the intertidal zone and dissipate force progressively along wide surf zones. Dissipative beaches are wide and flat in profile, with a wide shoaling and surf zone, composed of finer sediment, and characterised by spilling breakers.

Reflective beaches are steep, and are known for their coarse sand; they have no surf zone, and the waves break brusquely on the intertidal zone. Reflective beaches are typically steep in profile with a narrow shoaling and surf zone, composed of coarse sediment, and characterised by surging breakers. Coarser sediment allows percolation during the swash part of the wave cycle, thus reducing the strength of backwash and allowing material to be deposited in the swash zone

Depending on beach state, near bottom currents show variations in the relative dominance of motions due to: incident waves, subharmonic oscillations, infragravity oscillations, and mean longshore and rip currents. On reflective beaches, incident waves and subharmonic edge waves are dominant. In highly dissipative surf zones, shoreward decay of incident waves is accompanied by shoreward growth of infragravity energy; in the inner surf zone, currents associated with infragravity standing waves dominate. On intermediate states with pronounced bar-trough (straight or crescentic) topographies, incident wave orbital velocities are generally dominant but significant roles are also played by subharmonic and infragravity standing waves, longshore currents, and rips. The strongest rips and associated feeder currents occur in association with intermediate transverse bar and rip topographies.

Transitions between beach states are often caused by changes in wave energy, with storms causing reflective beach profiles to flatten (offshore movement of sediment under steeper waves), thus adopting a more dissipative profile. Morphodynamic processes are also associated with other coastal landforms, for example spur and groove formation topography on coral reefs and tidal flats in infilling estuaries.

See also

 Beach erosion and accretion
 Beach evolution
 Beach nourishment
 Raised beach
 Modern recession of beaches
 Paleoshoreline

 Integrated coastal zone management
 Coastal management, to prevent coastal erosion and creation of beach
 Coastal and oceanic landforms
 Coastal development hazards
 Coastal erosion
 Coastal geography
 Coastal engineering
 Coastal and Estuarine Research Federation (CERF)

 Erosion
 Bioerosion
 Blowhole
 Natural arch
 Wave-cut platform

 Longshore drift
 Deposition (sediment)
 Coastal sediment supply
 Sand dune stabilization
 Submersion

References
Wright, L.D., Short, A.D., 1984. "Morphodynamic variability of surf zones and beaches: a synthesis". Marine Geology, 56, 93-118.
Short, A.D., 1999. Handbook of Beach and Shoreface Morphodyanmics. West Sussex, UK: Wiley, 379pp.

Beaches
Coastal geography
Physical oceanography